Hassan al-Amri (1920–1989) Known as The General of Yemen. He was born in a Yemeni village called Al-Amaryah—his surname indicates that—in Al-Hada District. He was the Prime Minister of the Yemen Arab Republic for five terms between 1964 and 1971.

He was from the first batch to study in Iraq's War College in 1936.

He participated in the revolution of 1948 against Imam Yahya, which failed and he was jailed 7 years in prison of Hajja in Yemen, and then participated in the 1962 revolution against Imam Ahmed.

Al-Amri's first three terms were served under President Abdullah as-Sallal.  The dates of these terms were:
(his positions were, a prime minister, a Commander in Chief of the armed forces and a vice president)
 10 February to 29 April 1964
 6 January to 20 April 1965
 21 July 1965 to 18 September 1966

His final two terms were under President Abdul Rahman al-Iryani.
(Member of the Republican)
 21 December 1967 to 9 July 1969
 24 August to 5 September 1971

References

External links
rulers.org 

1920 births
1980s deaths
Prime Ministers of North Yemen
People of the North Yemen Civil War
Economy ministers of Yemen
20th-century Yemeni military personnel
Iraqi Military Academy alumni
Yemeni revolutionaries
Yemeni generals